GSAT-20 is a communication satellite jointly being developed by Indian Space Research Organisation Satellite Centre and Liquid Propulsion Systems Centre and will be launched by ISRO. GSAT-20 will be a continuation of GSAT series of communication satellites. The satellite is intended to add data transmission capacity to the communication infrastructure required by Smart Cities Mission of India.

It will be the first fully Electric Propulsion/EP enabled satellite which can be five to six times more efficient than chemical-based propulsion. It will be the first ISRO made satellite to move from Geostationary transfer orbit to Geosynchronous orbit using Electric Propulsion.

Payload
The satellite features a Ka-band high-throughput communications payload with 70 Gbit/s throughput utilizing 40 beams. Each beam will have 2 polarisations, effectively making them 80 beams.

Launch
The satellite is expected to be launched in 2024 on an LVM 3 launch vehicle.

See also 

 Indian Regional Navigational Satellite System
 GSAT

References 

GSAT satellites
2024 in India
2024 in spaceflight